Winds of the Wasteland is a 1936 Western film directed by Mack V. Wright and starring John Wayne and Phyllis Fraser. The film was released by Republic Pictures. The film was later released in a colorized version on home video/dvd under the title Stagecoach Run. It features an early appearance from Jon Hall.

Plot
In 1861, John Blair and his partner, Larry Adams are dismayed when the arrival of telegraph ends the Russell & Waddell Pony Express. Hoping to utilize their horse-riding skills, they decide to start a stage coach transportation business. They go to Buchanan City and ask local magnate Cal Drake if he is willing to sell them a stage coach. Instead, Drake offers them a franchise from his own stage coach line - a line out to bustling Crescent City.

Upon arriving at Crescent City, Blair and Adams quickly realize that they had been bamboozled into paying for the line as Crescent City is a ghost town. The only residents are the mayor, Rocky O'Brien, and Dr. William Forsythe. The mayor is thrilled to get not only new residents to double the size of the town, but a stage coach line too. Blair protests that there are no customers to transport. The mayor says there is a way for Blair to get all the money he owes and more. There will be a contest in the next few days where the fastest team in a race will win a $25,000 government contract to deliver mail to the area. With Blair's luck returning, he also meets a telegraph crew, whom he saves from poisoning after drinking from a local water hole. In appreciation, the telegraph crew offers to run the line through Crescent City if Blair will give them laborers to build the telegraph line.

Blair is able to get laborers to build the telegraph line and the population of Crescent City begins to skyrocket. Drake, upset that Blair has turned his con into a competing business, then decides to hire Blair to drive a gold shipment to Sacramento, only to ambush him. If Blair can get the gold to the destination, Drake will take $1,000 off of the original loan. Blair escapes the ambush and collects the money at gunpoint. Drake next hopes to stop Blair at the race. He gets his henchman to throw obstacles in Blair's way to defeat him by any means necessary. But despite all odds, Blair wins the race and the $25,000 reward.

Cast
 John Wayne as John Blair
 Phyllis Fraser as Barbara Forsythe
 Lew Kelly as Mayor Rocky O'Brien
 Douglas Cosgrove as Cal Drake (Buchanan Stage Line)
 Lane Chandler as Larry Adams (Blair's partner)
 Sam Flint as Dr. William "Doc" Forsythe
 Bob Kortman as Cherokee Joe (henchman)
 Ed Cassidy as Mr. Dodge (Pony Express manager)
 Jon Hall as Jim (Pony Express rider)
 Merrill McCormick as Henchman Pete
 Christian J. Frank as Telegraph crew chief
 Jack Rockwell as Buchanan City Marshal
 Arthur Millett as Postmaster In Buchanan City
 Tracy Layne as Reed

See also
 John Wayne filmography

References

External links
 
 
 
 

1936 films
Films set in 1861
American black-and-white films
Films directed by Mack V. Wright
1936 Western (genre) films
Republic Pictures films
American Western (genre) films
Films with screenplays by Joseph F. Poland
1930s English-language films
1930s American films